Spišské Podhradie is a town in Spiš in the Prešov Region of Slovakia. Its population is 3,775.

Spišské Podhradie is situated at the foot of the hill of Spiš Castle. It had a Zipser German settlement, with its own church and priest, in 1174. Just above, and adjacent to, the town is the ecclesiastical settlement of Spišská Kapitula (hence an old German name Kirchdorf, meaning "church town"). The town contains a number of Renaissance merchants' houses. It also has one of the few remaining synagogue buildings (now disused) in the region. The Sivá Brada cold water spring is located nearby.

Twin towns — sister cities 

Spišské Podhradie is twinned with:

  Głogów Małopolski, Poland
  Pinetop-Lakeside, Arizona, United States
  Show Low, Arizona, United States
  Vrbové, Slovakia

Pictures

References

External links 

 Official website

Cities and towns in Slovakia
Spiš
World Heritage Sites in Slovakia